David Hirsch may refer to:

 David Philip Hirsch (1896–1917), British Army officer and Victoria Cross recipient 
 David Hirsch (television personality) (born 1962), American television personality
 David Hirsch (rabbi) (born 1968)
 David A. Hirsch (born 1960), American businessman and activist

See also
 David Hirsh (born 1967), sociologist
 David Julian Hirsh (born 1973), Canadian actor